Henry Manning may refer to:

 Henry Manning (spy), spy in the exiled court of Charles II at Cologne and Brussels
 Henry Manning (politician) (1877–1963), Australian lawyer and politician
 Henry Edward Manning (1808–1892), English Roman Catholic Archbishop of Westminster
 Henry J. Manning (1859–?), U.S. Navy sailor and Medal of Honor recipient
Henry Manning (?–1924), American murder victim of Wanda Stopa